Articles related to the French overseas department of Guadeloupe include:

0–9

.gp – Internet country code top-level domain for Guadeloupe
1899 Hurricane San Ciriaco
1928 Okeechobee hurricane
2009 French Caribbean general strikes

A
Air Antilles Express
Air Caraïbes Atlantique
Air Caraïbes
Airports in Guadeloupe
Amphicyclotulus perplexus
Americas
North America
North Atlantic Ocean
West Indies
Mer des Caraïbes (Caribbean Sea)
Antilles (Antilles)
Petites Antilles (Lesser Antilles)
Islands of Guadeloupe
Anse-Bertrand
Antillean fruit-eating bat
Antillean nighthawk
Arrondissement of Basse-Terre
Arrondissement of Pointe-à-Pitre
Arrondissements of the Guadeloupe department
Atlas of Guadeloupe
Avicennia germinans

B
Baie-Mahault
Baillif
Balakadri
Barbados–France relations
Basse-Terre on Île de Basse-Terre – Capital of Guadeloupe
Basse-Terre 1st Canton
Basse-Terre 2nd Canton
Basse-Terre Cathedral
Basse-Terre Island
Biguine
Black-rumped waxbill
Boisripeau
Boisvin
Bouillante
Boula (music)
Invasion of Guadeloupe (1759), 1758–1759

C
Camaz 89
Canton of Anse-Bertrand
Canton of Baie-Mahault
Canton of Bouillante
Canton of Capesterre-de-Marie-Galante
Canton of Gourbeyre
Canton of Goyave
Canton of Grand-Bourg
Canton of La Désirade
Canton of Lamentin
Canton of Les Saintes
Canton of Petit-Bourg
Canton of Petit-Canal
Canton of Pointe-Noire
Canton of Saint-Claude
Canton of Saint-François
Canton of Saint-Louis
Canton of Trois-Rivières
Canton of Vieux-Habitants
Cantons of the Guadeloupe department
Capesterre-Belle-Eau 1st Canton
Capesterre-Belle-Eau 2nd Canton
Capesterre-Belle-Eau
Capesterre-de-Marie-Galante
Capital of Guadeloupe:  Basse-Terre on Île de Basse-Terre
Carbet Falls
Caribbean
Caribbean Carnival
Caribbean Sea
Categories:
:Category:Guadeloupe
:Category:Buildings and structures in Guadeloupe
:Category:Communications in Guadeloupe
:Category:Economy of Guadeloupe
:Category:Environment of Guadeloupe
:Category:Geography of Guadeloupe
:Category:Guadeloupe stubs
:Category:Guadeloupean culture
:Category:Guadeloupean people
:Category:Guadeloupe-related lists

:Category:History of Guadeloupe
:Category:Politics of Guadeloupe
:Category:Society of Guadeloupe
:Category:Sport in Guadeloupe
:Category:Transport in Guadeloupe
commons:Category:Guadeloupe
Cedrela odorata
Chassaing
Chazeau
Coat of arms of Guadeloupe
Coat of arms of Guadeloupe
Colonial and Departmental Heads of Guadeloupe
Communes of the Guadeloupe department
Communications in Guadeloupe
Communications in Guadeloupe
Conchou
Confédération générale du travail de Guadeloupe

D
Damoiseau Rhum
Daniel Marsin
Demographics of Guadeloupe
Deshaies
Doc Gynéco
Dominica Passage
Dominique Vian
Dubedou

E
Eastern Caribbean Gas Pipeline Company Limited
Economy of Guadeloupe
Elections in Guadeloupe
Extinct animals of Martinique and Guadeloupe

F

Félix Éboué
Flag of France
Flag of Guadeloupe
Fonds d'Or
Fort Napoléon des Saintes
France
French America
French colonization of the Americas
French language
French overseas department of Guadeloupe
French Republic (République française)
 French West Indies

G
Gardel, Guadeloupe
Geography of Guadeloupe
Giant ditch frog
Gourbeyre
Goyave
Grand-Bourg
Grande-Terre island
Guadeloupe (Région Guadeloupe)
Guadeloupe, adjective
Guadeloupe films
Guadeloupe franc
Guadeloupe livre
Guadeloupe national football team
Guadeloupe National Park
Guadeloupe Passage
Guadeloupe raccoon
Guadeloupe woodpecker
Guadeloupean, citizen of Guadeloupe
Guenette
Guillocheau
Gwo ka

H
Hinduism in Guadeloupe
History of Guadeloupe
Hurricane Allen
Hurricane Betsy (1956)
Hurricane Cleo
Hurricane Hortense
Hurricane Hugo
Hurricane Inez
Hurricane Lenny
Hurricane Luis

I
Îles des Saintes
International Organization for Standardization (ISO)
ISO 3166-1 alpha-2 country code for Guadeloupe: GP
ISO 3166-1 alpha-3 country code for Guadeloupe: GLP
Islands of Guadeloupe:
Basse-Terre
La Désirade
Grande-Terre
Marie-Galante
Iles de la Petite Terre
Iles des Saintes
Terre-de-Haut
Terre-de-Bas

J
Jabrun, Guadeloupe
Jabrun-du-Sud
Jean-Marc Mormeck
Jean-Paul Proust

K
Kahouanne

L
La Berthaudiere
La Désirade (commune)
La Désirade
La Goguette
La Grande Soufrière
La Rosette
Lamentin
Laura Flessel-Colovic
Lauranza Doliman
Laureal
Le Gosier 1st Canton
Le Gosier 2nd Canton
Le Gosier
Le Moule 1st Canton
Le Moule 2nd Canton
Le Moule
Lemercier, Guadeloupe
Les Abymes 1st Canton
Les Abymes 2nd Canton
Les Abymes 3rd Canton
Les Abymes 4th Canton
Les Abymes 5th Canton
Les Abymes
Les Aiglons
Lesser Antillean macaw
Lewoz
Ligue Guadeloupéenne de Football
Lilian Thuram
Lists related to Guadeloupe:
List of airports in Guadeloupe
List of extinct animals of Martinique and Guadeloupe
List of Guadeloupan films
List of Guadeloupe-related topics
List of islands of Guadeloupe
List of mammals in Guadeloupe
List of political parties in Guadeloupe
List of rivers of Guadeloupe
List of volcanoes in Guadeloupe
Louis Delgrès

M
Mahaudiere
Majestik Zouk
Malignon
Mammals of Guadeloupe
Marie-Galante
Massioux
Military of Guadeloupe
Monk parakeet
Morne-à-l'Eau
Morne-à-l'Eau 1st Canton
Morne-à-l'Eau 2nd Canton
Music of Guadeloupe

N
Nance
Nancy Fleurival

P
Palais-Sainte-Marguerite
Papaya
Passiflora foetida
Passport
Petit-Bourg
Petit-Canal
Petite Terre Islands
Pointe de la Grande Vigie
Pointe-à-Pitre
Pointe-à-Pitre 1st Canton
Pointe-à-Pitre 2nd Canton
Pointe-à-Pitre 3rd Canton
Pointe-à-Pitre International Airport
Pointe-Noire, Guadeloupe
Political parties in Guadeloupe
Politics of Guadeloupe
Portland, Guadeloupe
Port-Louis, Guadeloupe
Pressec

Q
Quatre Chemins

R
Région Guadeloupe (Guadeloupe)
Région Guadeloupe et Saint Martin scouting
Renard, Guadeloupe
République française (French Republic)
Rivers of Guadeloupe
Roman Catholic Diocese of Basse-Terre

S
Saint-Claude, Guadeloupe
Sainte-Anne 1st Canton
Sainte-Anne 2nd Canton
Sainte-Anne, Guadeloupe
Sainte-Marguerite, Guadeloupe
Sainte-Rose 1st Canton
Sainte-Rose 2nd Canton
Sainte-Rose, Guadeloupe
Saint-François, Guadeloupe
Saint-Louis, Guadeloupe
Scouting in Guadeloupe
Solanum mammosum
Swedish colonization of the Americas
Swietenia macrophylla

T
Terre-de-Bas Island
Terre-de-Bas
Terre-de-Haut Island
Terre-de-Haut
Thierry Henry
Thomas's yellow-shouldered bat
Transport in Guadeloupe
Trois-Rivières, Guadeloupe
Tropical Storm Dorothy (1970)

U
Utricularia alpina
Utricularia jamesoniana

V
Vaisseaux Bank
Victor Collot
Victor Hugues
Vieux-Fort, Guadeloupe
Vieux-Habitants
Vincent Acapandie
Volcanoes of Guadeloupe

W

William Gallas

Z
Zevallos
Zouk

See also

List of Caribbean-related topics
List of international rankings
Lists of country-related topics
Topic outline of geography
Topic outline of North America

References

External links

 
Guadeloupe